Kilsyth  is one of the twenty-one wards used to elect members of the North Lanarkshire Council. It elects three councillors and covers the town of Kilsyth (plus neighbouring Croy) with a population of 13,772 in 2019. Created in 2007, its boundaries remained unchanged in a 2017 review.

Councillors

Election Results

2017 Election

In July 2020 SNP councillor Mark Kerr was charged with five counts of historic sexual abuse by Police Scotland. This generated significant coverage in various national news outlets and Mr Kerr subsequently stepped down from the SNP, identifying as an Independent councillor from then on. He made no plea at his initial court hearing.

2012 Election

2007 Election

2008 by-election
Labour's Francis Griffin died on 10 November 2007. Mark Griffin held the seat for the party in the resulting by-election on 31 January 2008.

References

Wards of North Lanarkshire
Kilsyth